Archduchess Theresa of Austria may refer to:

 Archduchess Amalie Theresa of Austria (1807-1807), daughter of Francis II, Holy Roman Emperor and Maria Teresa of the Two Sicilies
 Archduchess Maria Theresa of Austria (1717-1780), Holy Roman Empress
 Archduchess Maria Theresa of Austria (1816-1867), Queen Consort of the Two Sicilies